The Group Bravery Citation is a bravery decoration awarded to Australians. It is awarded for a collective act of bravery by a group of people in extraordinary circumstances that is considered worthy of recognition. The Group Bravery Citation was created in 1990. The decorations recognise acts of bravery by members of the community who selflessly put themselves in jeopardy to protect the lives or property of others.

It is ranked 5th in the list of Australian bravery decoration in the Australian honours system.

Description
 The Group Bravery Citation is a bronze gilt sprig of wattle, Australia's floral emblem, positioned in the centre of a silver rectangle. 
 The multi-leaf sprig of wattle represents the nature of group participation - the coming together of the many to create a single entity.

Recipients
The Australian Government "It's an Honour" database contains 695 entries of people who have been awarded the medal.

See also
Australian Honours Order of Precedence

References

External links
It's an Honour

Civil awards and decorations of Australia
1990 establishments in Australia
Awards established in 1990